The Denmark women's national football team represents Denmark and Greenland in international women's football. The team is controlled by the Danish Football Association (DBU) and competes as a member of UEFA in various international football tournaments such as the FIFA Women's World Cup, UEFA Women's Euro, the Summer Olympics, and the Algarve Cup.

Denmark have qualified four times for the FIFA Women's World Cup and nine times for the UEFA Women's Championship, reaching the final in 2017.

At the UEFA Women's Euro 2017 in Netherlands, Denmark was drawn into Group A with Netherlands, Norway and Belgium. They secured a 1–0 victories over Belgium and Norway, but lost 1–0 to Netherlands. Despite that they managed to advance as runners-up in the group, to the quarter-finals against Germany. The Danes surprisingly won against the 22-year reign champions of Europe and qualified to the semifinals, with a 2–1 win. Denmark defeated Austria 3–0 on penalties to reach the final for the first time, after the match finished goalless. In the final the team met Netherlands at the De Grolsch Veste, Enschede, standing in front of a crowd of 28,182 spectators. The Dutch team defeated Denmark, by a 4–2 victory and claimed their first UEFA Euro title.

In March 2007, Denmark was ranked sixth in the FIFA Women's World Rankings, reaching the highest ranking since it was introduced. The worst ranking so far was a 20th place finish in June 2016.

Home stadium

The Denmark women's national football team usually plays their home matches at the Energi Viborg Arena, Viborg, having a capacity of 10,000 spectators.

The highest number of spectators for a women's international match on Danish soil is 9,337 and was set during the 2007 FIFA Women's World Cup qualifying cicle against Finland at the Viborg Stadium on 27 September 2006.

In new record for the national team is set to be done on 24 June 2022 at a Exhibition match against Brazil in Parken Stadium, Copenhagen, where over 10,000 tickets have already been sold as of 5 May 2022.

Current competitions

2023 FIFA World Cup qualification
Group E

Results and fixtures

The following is a list of match results in the last 12 months, as well as any future matches that have been scheduled.

Legend

2022

2023

Coaching staff

Managers

Players

Current squad
The following 23 players were named to the official squad for the 2023 Tournoi de France.

Caps and goals are current as of the 21 February 2023 match against .

Recent call-ups
The following list of active players were not called up for the latest match of the national team, but were called up for an A-level match within the last 12 months.

INJ

INJ

INJ
INJ

 INJ = Withdrew due to injury
 PRE = Preliminary squad
 RET = Retired from the national team
 COV = COVID-19 positive test or close contact

Previous squads

FIFA Women's World Cup
World Cup 1991 squad
World Cup 1995 squad
World Cup 1999 squad
World Cup 2007 squad

UEFA Women's Euro
Euro 1984 squad
Euro 1991 squad
Euro 1993 squad
Euro 1997 squad
Euro 2001 squad
Euro 2005 squad
Euro 2009 squad
Euro 2013 squad
Euro 2017 squad
Euro 2022 squad

Olympic Games
Olympics 1996 squad

Player records

Players listed in bold are still active at national level.

Most appearances

Top goalscorers

Competitive records

FIFA Women's World Cup

*Draws include knockout matches decided on penalty kicks.

Match History

Olympic Games record

UEFA Women's Championship

Algarve Cup record

Invitational trophies
Women's Nordic Football Championship: Winner 1974, 1975, 1976, 1982

World Cup (Old invitational event)
 1970 : Champions (non-official competition)
 1971 : Champions (non-official competition)
 1981 : Runners-up  (non-official competition)
 1984 : Did not participate (non-official competition)
 1985 : Third Place (non-official competition)
 1986 : Did not participate (non-official competition)
 1988 : Did not participate (non-official competition)

European Championship (Unofficial events)
 1969 : Runner-up (non-official competition)
 1979 : Champions (non-official competition)

Honours

See also

List of Denmark women's international footballers
Denmark women's national football team results
Denmark women's national under-20 football team
Denmark women's national under-19 football team
Denmark women's national under-17 football team

Notes

References

External links
Official website
FIFA profile

 
European women's national association football teams